Gyula Farkas, Farkas Gyula, or Julius Farkas may refer to:

 Gyula Farkas (linguistic scientist) (1894–1958), Hungarian literary historian, Finno-Ugric linguist (Finno-Ugrist)
 Gyula Farkas (natural scientist) (1847–1930), Hungarian mathematician and physicist